The men's field hockey tournament at the 2002 Asian Games was held in Gangseo Hockey Stadium, Busan, South Korea, from September 30 to October 12, 2002.

Squads

Results
All times are Korea Standard Time (UTC+09:00)

Preliminary

Group A

Group B

Classification (5–8)

Preliminary (5–8)

Classification (7–8)

Classification (5–6)

Final round

Semifinals

Final (3–4)

Final (1–2)

Final standing

References

Results

External links
Official website

Men
Asian Games
2002